In Europe is a live album by trumpeter Jack Walrath's Quintet. It was recorded at the Jazzhus Montmartre in 1982 and released on the SteepleChase label.

Track listing
All compositions by Jack Walrath 
 "Duesin' in Duesseldorf" – 17:26
 "Where Have I Been Before" – 5:43
 "At Home in Rome" – 13:44
 "Reverend Red" – 7:21

Personnel
Jack Walrath – trumpet 
Glenn Ferris – trombone
Michael Cochrane – piano
Anthony Cox – bass 
Jimmy Madison – drums

References

SteepleChase Records live albums
Jack Walrath live albums
1983 live albums
Albums recorded at Jazzhus Montmartre